Martha Shoffner is the former state treasurer of Arkansas. A Democrat, she was first elected in 2006, taking office in January 2007. She was re-elected in 2010.

History
Shoffner was born and raised in Jackson County. Born to a farmer and a school teacher, she graduated from Newport High School and attended Memphis State University and Arkansas State University. She started working in advertising and is also a licensed real estate agent.

Career
She was elected to the Arkansas House of Representatives in 1996.

After being term limited, she was an unsuccessful candidate for the Democratic nomination for the state auditor. In 2005, Shoffner announced her candidacy for State Treasurer on the steps of the Jackson County Courthouse. After being outspent almost 3-to-1 Shoffner was elected to the office in 2006.

Arrest
On May 18, 2013, the FBI arrested Shoffner on a charge of extortion. Following her release on bail, Shoffner resigned as Arkansas State Treasurer on May 21, 2013.

She was subsequently indicted on June 5, 2013, by a Federal Grand Jury on six counts of extortion under color of official right, one count of attempted extortion under color of official right, and seven counts of receipt of a bribe by an agent of a state government receiving federal funds. She was convicted of all counts on March 11, 2014, by a jury of seven women and five men. On August 28, 2015, she was sentenced to two-and-a-half years in federal prison.

References

1940s births
Living people
State treasurers of Arkansas
Democratic Party members of the Arkansas House of Representatives
American real estate brokers
University of Memphis alumni
Arkansas State University alumni
People from Jackson County, Arkansas
Politicians convicted of extortion under color of official right
Politicians convicted of program bribery
Women state legislators in Arkansas
Arkansas politicians convicted of crimes
20th-century American politicians
20th-century American women politicians
21st-century American politicians
21st-century American women politicians